Ahmed Abdulla (born. Ahmed Abdulla Mohamed Abdulla Al Shamisi) is an Emarati footballer who plays as a midfielder .

He did not take part in the 2010 AFC Champions League.

External links
Ahmed Al-Shamsi Statistics At Goalzz.com
http://www.alainfc.net/en/index.php?p=playerinfo&pid=360

Emirati footballers
Al Ain FC players
Al-Wasl F.C. players
Emirates Club players
Baniyas Club players
Living people
UAE Pro League players
1988 births
Association football midfielders